Time After Time is a 1979 American science fiction film written and directed by Nicholas Meyer and starring Malcolm McDowell, David Warner, and Mary Steenburgen. Filmed in Panavision, it was the directing debut of Meyer, whose screenplay is based on the premise from Karl Alexander's novel Time After Time (which was unfinished at the time) and a story by Alexander and Steve Hayes. The film presents a story in which British author H. G. Wells uses his time machine to pursue Jack the Ripper into the 20th century.

Plot
In 1893 London, popular writer Herbert George Wells displays a time machine to his skeptical dinner guests. After he explains how it works (including a "non-return key" that keeps the machine at the traveler's destination and a "vaporizing equalizer" that keeps the traveler and machine on equal terms), police constables  arrive at the house searching for Jack the Ripper. A bag with blood-stained gloves belonging to one of Herbert's friends, a surgeon named John Leslie Stevenson, leads them to conclude that Stevenson might be the infamous killer. Wells races to his laboratory, but the time machine is gone.

Stevenson has escaped to the future, but because he does not have the "non-return" key, the machine automatically returns to 1893. Herbert uses it to pursue Stevenson to November 5, 1979, where the machine has ended up on display at a museum in San Francisco. He is deeply shocked by the future, having expected it to be an enlightened socialist utopia, only to find chaos in the form of airplanes, automobiles and a worldwide history of war, crime and bloodshed.

At an antique shop, Herbert exchanges some British bank notes for present-day American money. Growing hungry after a day without food, he enters a McDonald's and is alternately puzzled and pleased with 1979 dining options, noting the similarity between 1890s pommes frites from France and modern French fries. Wells is still ruffled by the idea of dining without tableware.

Reasoning that Stevenson would also need to exchange his British money, Herbert asks about him at various banks. At the Chartered Bank of London, he meets employee Amy Robbins, who says she had directed Stevenson to a local hotel.

Confronted by his one-time friend Herbert, Stevenson confesses that he finds modern society to be pleasingly violent, stating: "Ninety years ago, I was a freak. Today, I'm an amateur."

Herbert demands he return to 1893 to face justice, but Stevenson instead attempts to wrestle the time machine's key from him. Their struggle is interrupted by a maid and Stevenson flees, getting hit by a car during the frantic chase. Herbert follows him to the hospital emergency room and mistakenly gets the impression that Stevenson has died from his injuries.

Herbert meets up with Amy Robbins again and she initiates a romance. Stevenson returns to the bank to exchange more money. Suspecting that it was Amy who had led Herbert to him, he finds out where she lives.

Herbert, hoping to convince her of the truth, takes a highly skeptical Amy three days into the future. Once there, she is aghast to see a newspaper headline revealing her own murder as the Ripper's fifth victim.

Herbert persuades her that they must go back – it is their duty to attempt to prevent the fourth victim's murder, then prevent Amy's. However, they are delayed upon their return to the present and can do no more than phone the police. Stevenson kills again, and Herbert is arrested because of his knowledge of the killing. Amy is left alone, totally defenseless, and at the mercy of the "San Francisco Ripper".

While Herbert unsuccessfully tries to convince the police of Amy's peril, she attempts to hide from Stevenson. When the police finally do investigate her apartment, they find the dismembered body of a woman. Now convinced of Herbert's innocence, the police release a now-heartbroken Wells. However, he is contacted by Stevenson, who had actually killed Amy's coworker (revealed to be the dead body in Amy's apartment) and taken Amy hostage in order to extort the time machine key from Wells.

Stevenson flees with the key – and Amy as insurance – to attempt a permanent escape in the time machine. Using Amy's car, driving the unfamiliar machine erratically, Herbert manages to follow them back to the museum. While Herbert bargains for Amy's life, she is able to escape. As Stevenson starts up the time machine, Herbert removes the "vaporizing equalizer" from it, causing Stevenson to vanish while the machine does not. As Herbert had explained earlier, this causes the machine to remain in place while its passenger is sent traveling endlessly through time with no way to stop; in effect, he is destroyed.

Herbert proclaims that the time has come to return to his own time, in order to destroy a machine that he now knows is too dangerous for primitive mankind. Amy pleads with him to take her along, explaining she has no remaining ties in the 20th century. The film ends with the caption: "H.G. Wells married Amy Catherine Robbins, who died in 1927. As a writer, he anticipated socialism, global war, space travel, and women's liberation. He died in 1946."

Cast
 Malcolm McDowell as Herbert George Wells
 David Warner as John Leslie Stevenson/Jack the Ripper
 Mary Steenburgen as Amy Robbins
 Charles Cioffi as Police Lt. Mitchell
 Kent Williams as assistant
 Patti D'Arbanville as Shirley
 Joseph Maher as Adams

Production
According to Meyer from the commentary track for the DVD and Blu-ray release of the film, the author of the novel presented Meyer with 55 pages of his unpublished novel and asked Meyer to critique his work. Meyer liked the premise and immediately optioned the story so he could write a screenplay based on the material and develop the story his own way.

McDowell was attracted to the material because he was looking for something different from the sex and violence in Caligula, in which he played the title character.

While preparing to portray Wells, McDowell obtained a copy of a 78 rpm recording of Wells speaking. McDowell was "absolutely horrified" to hear that Wells spoke in a high-pitched, squeaky voice with a pronounced Southeast London accent, which McDowell felt would have resulted in unintentional humor if he tried to mimic it for the film. McDowell abandoned any attempt to recreate Wells's authentic speaking style and preferred a more "dignified" style.

According to David Warner, the studio wanted Mick Jagger for the role of John Leslie Stevenson but director Nicholas Meyer and producer Herb Jaffe fought for Warner to get the role.

It was one of the last films scored by veteran composer Miklós Rózsa, who received the 1979 Saturn Award for Best Music.

Time After Time was filmed throughout San Francisco, including Cow Hollow, North Beach, the Hyatt Regency hotel, California Academy of Sciences in Golden Gate Park, the Marina District, Ghirardelli Square, Fisherman's Wharf, the Richmond District, the Golden Gate Bridge, Grace Cathedral on Nob Hill, the Embarcadero Center, Chinatown, the Marina Green, the Palace of Fine Arts, Potrero Hill, and the Civic Center.

Release
The film premiered with a gala presentation at the Toronto International Film Festival on September 7, 1979.

Reception

Critical response
Time After Time received a positive response from critics. On review aggregator Rotten Tomatoes, the film holds an approval rating of 87% based on 31 reviews. The site's consensus reads, "With the three principal actors clearly having fun with their roles, Time After Time becomes an amusing, light-hearted fantasy lark."

Variety described the film as "a delightful, entertaining trifle of a film that shows both the possibilities and limitations of taking liberties with literature and history. Nicholas Meyer has deftly juxtaposed Victorian England and contemporary America in a clever story, irresistible due to the competence of its cast". Janet Maslin of The New York Times similarly lauded, "Time After Time is every bit as magical as the trick around which it revolves". She continued:

The interior scenes set in London borrow heavily from the 1960 film The Time Machine, which was based on the 1895 H.G. Wells novella of the same name. Commentators also noticed parallels between Time After Time and Back to the Future Part III in which Mary Steenburgen appeared. She said:

Actually, I've played the same scene in that film (Time After Time) and in (BTTF) Part III... I've had a man from a different time period tell me that he's in love with me, but he has to go back to his own time. My response in both cases is, of course, disbelief, and I order them out of my life. Afterwards, I find out I was wrong and that, in fact, the man is indeed from another time, and I go after him (them) to profess my love. It's a pretty strange feeling to find yourself doing the same scene, so many years apart, for the second time in your career.

The casting of Steenburgen for Back to the Future Part III appears to be deliberately intended to mirror the earlier role. In Time After Time, the woman lives in the 20th century and the time traveler is from the 19th. In Back to the Future Part III, the woman inhabits the 19th century and the time traveler is from the 20th. In both films, the woman eventually goes back with the time traveler to live in his own time period.

Some similar time travel incongruities as well as the modern San Francisco urban setting also appeared in 1986's Star Trek IV: The Voyage Home, for which Nicholas Meyer shared writing credit. The details of time travelers from distant eras obtaining and exchanging present day American currency were similar in both films. In Star Trek IV, a featured female character, Dr. Gillian Taylor, ends up joining her paramour, Captain James T. Kirk, living in the future, similar to the conclusion of Time After Time.

Accolades
Nicholas Meyer won the Saturn Award for Best Writing, Mary Steenburgen won the Saturn Award for Best Actress, and Miklós Rózsa won the Saturn Award for Best Music. Saturn Award nominations went to Meyer for Best Director, Malcolm McDowell for Best Actor, David Warner for Supporting Actor, and Sal Anthony and Yvonne Kubis for Best Costumes, and the film was nominated for Best Science Fiction Film.

Nicholas Meyer won the Antenne II Award and the Grand Prize at the Avoriaz Fantastic Film Festival and he was nominated for the Edgar Allan Poe Award for Best Motion Picture Screenplay and the Hugo Award for Best Dramatic Presentation.

In other media

Television

On May 12, 2016, the ABC television network announced that it had picked up a Time After Time television series to air in the 2016–2017 television season. The series, executive produced and written by Kevin Williamson, was cancelled after only five episodes.

References

External links
 
 
 
 

1979 films
1970s chase films
1970s science fiction adventure films
American alternate history films
American chase films
American adventure thriller films
American romantic fantasy films
American science fiction adventure films
Films about Jack the Ripper
Films about time travel
Films based on American novels
Films based on works by H. G. Wells
Cultural depictions of H. G. Wells
Films directed by Nicholas Meyer
Films set in 1893
Films set in 1979
Films set in London
Films set in San Francisco
Films set in the Victorian era
Films scored by Miklós Rózsa
Films shot in Los Angeles
Films shot in San Francisco
Orion Pictures films
Films with screenplays by Nicholas Meyer
The Time Machine
Warner Bros. films
1970s romantic fantasy films
1979 directorial debut films
1970s English-language films
1970s American films